Pilip Vaitsiakhovich (born 26 March 1990) is a Belarusian professional footballer who plays for Allsvenskan club IFK Värnamo as a goalkeeper. Besides Belarus, he has played in Sweden.

Career
Vaitsiakhovich began his career with Partizan Minsk and played in the 2008 season twelve games on loan for FC Polotsk in the First League. On 3 February 2011 Vaitsiakhovich left his homeland and signed with Swedish club IK Frej.

International career
Vaitsiakhovich played one game for the Belarus national under-17 football team, one for the Belarus U-18 national team and won six caps for the Belarus U-19 national team. He has also been capped 5 times for the Belarus U21 side.

References

External links
 
 

1990 births
Living people
People from Maladzyechna
Sportspeople from Minsk Region
Belarusian footballers
Association football goalkeepers
Belarusian expatriate footballers
Expatriate footballers in Sweden
FC Partizan Minsk players
FC Polotsk players
FC Dynamo Brest players
FC Rechitsa-2014 players
Assyriska FF players
AFC Eskilstuna players
Umeå FC players
FC Trollhättan players
IFK Värnamo players
Vasalunds IF players